WJYP (1300 AM) is a sports-formatted broadcast radio station licensed to St. Albans, West Virginia, United States, serving Western Kanawha County, West Virginia and Central Putnam County, West Virginia.  WJYP is owned and operated by L.M. Communications, Inc.

External links
 The Jock Online

JYP
Sports radio stations in the United States
Radio stations established in 1956
1956 establishments in West Virginia